Gratianopolis ("city of Gratian") may refer to:

 Gratianopolis (Mauretania Caesariensis), a Roman city in North Africa and a Roman Catholic titular bishopric
 Gratianopolis (antique city), a Roman city (formerly Cularo and now Grenoble, France)
 Gratini, Gratianoupolis, or Gratianou, a city in Thrace